Uzunkum Nature Park is a nature park declared coastal area in Kocaeli Province, northwestern Turkey.

Uzunkum, literally long sandy beach, is located at Black Sea east of Cebeci village in Kandıra district of Kocaeli Province. The area was declared a nature park by the Ministry of Environment and Forest in 2014. The nature park consists of the parts, the sandy beach in the north and forested hillside.

The nature park offers outdoor recreational activities like hiking, swimming, surfing and angling.

Flora
The vegetation of the nature park consists of the endangered sea daffodil (Pancratium maritimum), Syrian juniper (Juniperus drupacea), juniper, Valonia oak (Quercus macrolepis), laurel (Laurus nobilis), oak, hornbeam (Carpinus), common ash (Fraxinus excelsior), cedar (Cedrus), cypress, willow, rose hip, buxus, European cornel (Cornus mas), spurge (Cornus mas), Cercis, pilewort, Crocus, trefoil (Trifolium), hemp and diverse algae species.

Fauna
The nature is habitat for the mammals fox, jackal, hare, beaver, badger, crested porcupine, the reptile tortoise, the bird species woodcock, quail, gull, black cormorant, francolin, partridge, common blackbird, kingfisher and owl.

References

Beaches of Turkey
Nature parks in Turkey
landforms of Kocaeli Province
Protected areas established in 2014
2014 establishments in Turkey
Kandıra